Old Åkra Church is a historic parish church of the Church of Norway in Karmøy Municipality in Rogaland county, Norway. It is located in the town of Åkrehamn located on the western coast of the island of Karmøy. It formerly was the main church for the Åkra parish which is part of the Karmøy prosti (deanery) in the Diocese of Stavanger. The white, wooden church was built in a long church design in 1820 using designs by an unknown architect. The church seats about 320 people.

History

The earliest existing historical records of the church date back to the year 1301, but the church was likely built during the 12th century. Around 1600, the old medieval stave church was heavily renovated and rebuilt. In 1674, the church was described as being dilapidated, so major repairs were again carried out.

In June 1820, the old church was torn down and a new building was constructed on the same site. On 5 November 1820, the church held its first worship service, just five months after the old one was demolished. It was formally consecrated on 29 July 1821. In 1852, the nave was extended to the west. In 1899, a sacristy was built on the east end.

Shortly after the turn of the century, there was talk of building a new church on Åkra, but instead of new construction, the old church was restored both in the 1930s and again during the 1950s. The most recent restoration was made in 1970 when the church was stiffened with steel construction, made by Skudenes Stålindustri.

After the new church was completed, the old church was taken out of regular use and has been used mostly for special occasions since that time.

See also
List of churches in Rogaland

References

Karmøy
Churches in Rogaland
Wooden churches in Norway
19th-century Church of Norway church buildings
Churches completed in 1820
13th-century establishments in Norway